Duo may refer to:

Places
Duo, West Virginia, an unincorporated community and coal town in Greenbrier County, West Virginia
Duo, Tampere, a shopping centre in Hervanta, Tampere, Finland
DUO, a twin-tower development in Singapore

Arts, entertainment and media

Fictional characters
Duo (Mega Man), a fictional protagonist in the Capcom video game series Mega Man
Duo Maxwell, a fictional protagonist in the television series Gundam Wing
 Duo, the fictional owl mascot of the language learning website and mobile application Duolingo

Films
Duo (1996 film), a 1996 independent film
Duo (2006 film), a Canadian romantic comedy film directed by Richard Ciupka
Pas de deux (film), a 1969 Canadian film also known as Duo

Music
Duet or duo, a musical piece performed by two musicians
 Musical duo, a musical ensemble composed of two musicians

Albums
Duo (Kenny Drew and Niels-Henning Ørsted Pedersen album), 1973
Duo 2, Kenny Drew and Niels-Henning Ørsted Pedersen album, 1974
Duo (Marilyn Crispell and Gerry Hemingway album), 1992
Duo (Richard Marx and Matt Scannell album), 2008
Duo (Merzbow album) box set, 2012
Duo (Peter Ostroushko and Dean Magraw album), 1991
Duo (Cedar Walton and David Williams album), 1990
Duo (Hank Jones and Red Mitchell album), 1987

Other media
Duo (novel), a novel by Colette
The Duo, a 2011 South Korean television series
Comedy duo, also known as a double act

Computing
Core 2 Duo, a computer processor from manufacturer Intel
 Google Duo, a video chat app made by Google
PowerBook Duo, a laptop computer from computer maker Apple

Other uses
Duo Airways, a defunct UK airline
Duo Interpretation, a speaking event
TL Ultralight TL-22 Duo, Czech ultralight trike design

See also

Dynamic duo (disambiguation)

Dual (disambiguation)
Double (disambiguation)
Pair (disambiguation)
Twin (disambiguation)